Cats Don't Have Vertigo is a 2014 Portuguese film directed by António-Pedro Vasconcelos.

Cast
Maria do Céu Guerra as Rosa
João Jesus as Jó
Nicolau Breyner as Joaquim
Fernanda Serrano as Luísa

Production
The film was shot in Lisbon.

References

External links

Films directed by António-Pedro Vasconcelos
Films set in Portugal
Films shot in Lisbon
Portuguese comedy-drama films
2014 films
Sophia Award winners